The 2018 Polish local elections were held on October 21 for all 16 provincial (voivodeship, województwo) assemblies, 380 county (powiat) councils, and 2477 commune (gmina) councils. There were also direct elections for commune heads (mayors and city presidents), with a second, run-off round for these offices on November 4.

The local elections were a victory of the ruling Law and Justice (PiS), though the opposition Civic Coalition (KO) maintained control of the majority of cities, including the capital Warsaw.

National

!colspan=2 |Party/Coalition
!%
!±
!Seats
!±
|- style="background-color:#E9E9E9;text-align:center;"
! width="5" style="background-color:"|
| style="text-align:left;"| Law and Justice (Prawo i Sprawiedliwość, PiS)
| 34.13
| 7.25
| 
| 83
|- style="text-align:center;"
! width="5" style="background-color:"|
| style="text-align:left;"| Platform.Modern Civic Coalition (Platforma.Nowoczesna Koalicja Obywatelska, KO)
| 26.97
| 0.68
| 
| 15
|- style="text-align:center;"
! width="5" style="background-color:"|
| style="text-align:left;"| Polish People's Party (Polskie Stronnictwo Ludowe, PSL)
| 12.07
| 11.81
| 
| 87
|- style="text-align:center;"
! width="5" style="background-color:"|
| style="text-align:left;"| SLD Left Together (SLD Lewica Razem, SLD)
| 6.62
| 2.17
| 
| 17
|- style="text-align:center;"
! width="5" style="background-color:"|
| style="text-align:left;"| Kukiz'15 (Kukiz'15, K'15)
| 5.63
| New
| 
| 0
|- style="text-align:center;"
! width="5" style="background-color:"|
| style="text-align:left;"| Nonpartisan Local Government Activists (Bezpartyjni Samorządowcy, BS)
| 5.28
|  4.43
| 
| 11
|} Notes:

Voivodeship councils

Election results (%)

Seats Distribution

County councils

Municipal councils

References

External links

Local elections
History of Poland (1989–present)
Local elections in Poland
October 2018 events in Poland